Don Dickison (born 6 July 1966) is a Canadian rower. He competed at the 1988 Summer Olympics and the 1992 Summer Olympics.

References

External links
 

1966 births
Living people
Canadian male rowers
Olympic rowers of Canada
Rowers at the 1988 Summer Olympics
Rowers at the 1992 Summer Olympics
Sportspeople from Jacksonville, Florida
Pan American Games medalists in rowing
Pan American Games silver medalists for Canada
Pan American Games bronze medalists for Canada
Rowers at the 1987 Pan American Games
Rowers at the 1991 Pan American Games
Medalists at the 1987 Pan American Games
20th-century Canadian people